Naturtheater Hayingen  is a theatre in Hayingen, Baden-Württemberg, Germany.

Theatres in Baden-Württemberg